HMS Periwinkle was a , built for the Royal Navy during the Second World War, and was in service in the Battle of the Atlantic.
In 1942 she was transferred to the United States Navy as part of the Reverse Lend-Lease arrangement and renamed USS Restless, one of the s.
With the end of hostilities she was returned to the Royal Navy and sold into mercantile service.

Design and construction
Periwinkle was built at Harland & Wolff, Belfast, as part of the 1939 War Emergency building programme. She was laid down on 30 October 1939 and launched 24 February 1940. She was completed and entered service on 8 April 1940, being named for the periwinkle family of flowers.
As built, Periwinkle had the short forecastle that was a feature of the early Flowers, and which adversely effected their habitability. She also had the merchant-style enclosed wheelhouse, and the foremast stepped ahead of the bridge, of the  original design.

Service history

Royal Navy
After working up, Periwinkle was assigned to the Western Approaches Escort Force for service as a convoy escort. In this role she  was engaged in all the duties performed by escort ships; protecting convoys, searching for and attacking U-boats which attacked ships in convoy, and rescuing survivors.
In 23 months service Periwinkle escorted 41 North Atlantic, 10 Gibraltar and 10 South Atlantic convoys 
assisting in the safe passage of over 1500 ships.
She was involved in three major convoy battles: In September 1940  Periwinkle was part of the escort for SC 2, which was attacked by a U-boat pack, losing 5 ships sunk.
In October 1940 she was with HX 77, which lost six ships sunk. 
In June 1941 Periwinkle was with OB 329, which saw 4 ships sunk and one U-boat (U-147) destroyed;  Periwinkle shared in its destruction.
In September 1941 she was with HG 73, which lost nine merchant and one warship sunk.

US Navy

Following the entry of the United States into the war the US Navy was in need of anti-submarine warfare vessels, and to meet this need a number of ships were transferred from the Royal Navy as part of a reverse Lend-Lease arrangement.
Periwinkle was commissioned into the USN on 15 March 1942 as USS Restless. After an overhaul Restless was employed as an escort on convoys between New York and the Caribbean.
In August 1945 she was decommissioned and returned to the Royal Navy.

Fate
Periwinkle was stricken in 1947 and sold into commercial service as the merchant ship Perilock. She was scrapped at Hong Kong in 1953.

Notes

References
Clay Blair : Hitler’s U-Boat War Vol I  (1996) 
R Gardiner, R Gray : Conway's All the World's Fighting Ships 1922–1946 (1980) 
 Elliott, Peter: Allied Escort Ships of World War II (1977) 
Hague, Arnold : The Allied Convoy System 1939–1945 (2000)  (Canada) .  (UK)
Paul Kemp (1997) U-Boats Destroyed Arms and Armour

External links
HMS Periwinkle at uboat.net
USS Restless at uboat.net
 Restless at history.navy.mil

Flower-class corvettes of the Royal Navy
Temptress-class gunboats
1940 ships